Ismail Mohamed Youssef (born 10 August 1967) is a Qatari middle-distance runner. He competed in the 800 metres at the 1988 Summer Olympics and the 1992 Summer Olympics.

References

1967 births
Living people
Athletes (track and field) at the 1988 Summer Olympics
Athletes (track and field) at the 1992 Summer Olympics
Qatari male middle-distance runners
Olympic athletes of Qatar
Place of birth missing (living people)
Asian Games medalists in athletics (track and field)
Asian Games silver medalists for Qatar
Athletes (track and field) at the 1990 Asian Games
Medalists at the 1990 Asian Games